Sébastien Josse is a French professional offshore sailor, born on 31 March 1975 in Montereau-Fault-Yonne (Seine-et-Marne). He is originally from Nice and lives in the Finistère in Clohars-Carnoet. He was nominate for the World Sailing – World Sailor of the Year Awards in 2006.

Career highlights

References

1975 births
Living people
Sportspeople from Morbihan
French male sailors (sport)
IMOCA 60 class sailors
Volvo Ocean Race sailors
French Vendee Globe sailors
Vendée Globe finishers
2004 Vendee Globe sailors
2008 Vendee Globe sailors
2016 Vendee Globe sailors
People from Hennebont